Charles Olivier de Saint-Georges, 4th Marquis of Vérac (Chateau of Couhé-Vérac, 10 October 1743 – 28 October 1828) was a French military officer and diplomat of the French Ancien Régime.

Personal life
Vérac (as he is commonly known in the historical literature) was the son of François Olivier de Saint-Georges de Vérac and Elisabeth Marie de Riencourt. His father, grandfather and great-grandfather were  lieutenants général de Province of Poitou. He himself received that rank at age 10.

He married Marie Charlotte Joséphine Sabine de Croÿ d'Havré, the daughter of the Duke of Havré on 14 April 1760. They had the following children:
Charles François Marie Joseph 1761-1763
Anne Louis Joseph César Olivier 1763-1838
Alphonse Christian Théodoric Joseph Olivier 1765
Anne Justine Elisabeth Joséphine 1767
Olivier Armand Maximilien François 1768-1858
Gabriel Louis Christian Joseph +1839

Career
Vérac entered the Musketeers of the Guard in 1757. In 1761 he became Aide-de-camp of his father-in-law during the Seven Years' War. He was wounded in the arm at the Battle of Villinghausen by the same cannon ball that killed his father-in-law. In 1767 he was appointed Colonel of the Régiment de Grenadiers de France. In 1770 he was promoted to Mestre de camp. Soon after, he was made a Chevalier de St. Louis.

After this accomplished military career he entered the diplomatic service in 1772, when he was sent as an envoy extraordinary and minister plenipotentiary to the court of Hesse-Kassel. His next posting was the court of Denmark–Norway in 1774. In 1779 he was accredited at the court of Catherine the Great, where he stayed till he was promoted and sent as ambassador  to the States General of the Netherlands in The Hague in 1784.

The Dutch Republic at the time was in the middle of the political upheavals of the Patriottentijd. The American Revolutionary War had just ended in 1783, but the Fourth Anglo-Dutch War, of which it was a part, only ended in 1784. There had therefore  not been a British envoy for some time, but at the end of 1784 the new British envoy Sir James Harris also came to The Hague. They would be each others opponents in the coming years. Both were deeply involved in the internal politics of the country, Vérac on the side of the Patriots, the opponents of the Orangist party of the stadtholder William V, Prince of Orange. Harris became the de facto leader of the Orangists. Both engaged in espionage and covert political operations against their political opponents. Vérac actively supported the aspirations of the "democratic" wing of the Patriots, latterly also against the Patriot regenten, when the two factions became each others enemies. During the Patriot Revolt of 1785-1787 Vérac financially supported the Free Corps that occasionally fought the Dutch States Army troops of the stadtholder. After the incident on 28 June 1787 of the arrest of Princess Wilhelmina, the spouse of the stadtholder, who was the sister of king Frederick William II of Prussia, a European diplomatic crisis developed. France tried to keep the Prussians and British at bay, while protecting its interests in the Dutch Republic. Unfortunately, the French foreign policy was in disarray after the death of minister Vergennes earlier in 1787. The new foreign minister Montmorin had a less sure hand. Also, there was a government crisis at the end of August, just when the Prussian invasion of Holland was imminent. The political maneuvering in France between the different factions undermined his position, as the chevalier de la Luzerne was angling for his job. Vérac was recalled on 20 August 1787. Montmorin assured him that there was no personal dissatisfaction with him, and that he would receive a pension while a new position was found for him. Vérac's biographer Michaud speculates that the recall was motivated by the fact that Vérac opposed the return of the stadtholder as military governor of The Hague (a post he had been deprived of by the States of Holland in 1786), but this is unlikely as it was official policy of both the French government and the Dutch government in power at the time, just as he had faithfully executed the French policy towards the Patriots.

After his recall Vérac remained for two years sous la remise ("on the backburner") before he was again given a diplomatic post, this time as ambassador to the Old Swiss Confederacy in 1789. But after the Flight to Varennes of king Louis XVI of France in June 1791 Vérac immediately handed in his resignation. He departed for Lindau. Later he resided for short periods at Venice, Florence and Regensburg. But after he had resigned he had been registered as an Émigré, which brought penalties of proscription with it. His worldly goods were confiscated and mostly sold off, or destroyed, his noble titles burned.

Vérac was able to return to France in 1801, and lived as a private citizen until the Bourbon Restoration of 1814 and 1815. King Louis XVIII of France gave him the (this time military) rank of Lieutenant-General, and did him the honor of allowing him to participate in  the "Grandes Entrées". Vérac spent his final years in his birthplace among his family. He died on 28 October 1818, just over 85 years old.

Notes and references

Notes

References

Sources

1743 births
1828 deaths
French marquesses
French Army officers
18th-century French diplomats
19th-century French nobility
People of the Patriottentijd
Political history of the Netherlands
18th-century French nobility